= Ladislav Lipscher =

Slovak historian

Ladislav Lipscher (1915–1990) was a Slovak historian and defector from Communist Czechoslovakia. Lipscher did much of his research before his defection, allowing him to base his works on then-inaccessible archives locked behind the Iron Curtain.

== Works ==
- Lipscher, Ladislav (1979). Verfassung und politische Verwaltung in der Tschechoslowakei: 1918-1939 (in German). Oldenbourg. ISBN 978-3-486-44471-1.
- Lipscher, Ladislav (1980). Die Juden im Slowakischen Staat, 1939-1945 (in German). R. Oldenbourg. ISBN 978-3-486-48661-2.
- Lipscher, Ladislav (1992). Židia v slovenskom štáte, 1939-1945 (in Slovak). Print-servis. ISBN 978-80-900470-2-0.
